Upothenia is a monotypic moth genus of the family Erebidae. Its only species, Upothenia acutipennis, is known from Costa Rica. Both the genus and the species were first described by Schaus, the genus in 1913 and the species one year earlier.

References

Herminiinae
Monotypic moth genera